Aaron James Finch (born 17 November 1986) is an Australian international cricketer who served as the captain of the Australian cricket team in ODI and T20I cricket. In domestic cricket, he currently plays for and captains the San Francisco Unicorns of Major League Cricket  Finch currently holds the record for two of the three highest individual scores in Twenty20 Internationals (T20I), his score of 172 against Zimbabwe in July 2018 beating his previous record of 156 against England in 2013. In July 2018, he became the first player to reach 900 rating points on the official International Cricket Council (ICC) T20I rankings. He made his Test debut for Australia in October 2018. He is also a part time commentator with Fox Cricket and Triple M.

Finch has played domestically for Victoria and Melbourne Renegades. He is an opening batter, and occasional left arm orthodox spinner.

Junior and domestic career

As a junior, Finch played at Colac West Cricket Club in the Colac & District Cricket Association (CDCA) as a wicket-keeper. A right-handed batsman, he played in the 2006 Under-19 Cricket World Cup in Sri Lanka.

Finch got his opportunity to become established as a regular in the Victorian side in the 2009/10 season. He hit his maiden first-class cricket century against Tasmania at the Melbourne Cricket Ground (MCG) in a partnership of 212 runs for the third wicket with David Hussey. In October 2012, while filling in as captain, he scored 154 runs at the Gabba against Queensland, a new highest score for Victoria in domestic one day cricket.

After playing for the Melbourne Renegades in the inaugural Big Bash League season in 2011, he captained the side in 2012 and was the Big Bash League player of the year. Finch captained the Melbourne Renegades from 2012 through to 2020, before stepping down citing he wanted to spend more time with his family. He then returned to captaincy for the back half of the 2022/23 season, after an injury to captain Nic Maddinson. In December 2015, Finch became the first player to score 1,000 runs in the Big Bash. Finch became only the second player to score over 3,000 runs in the Big Bash on the 1st of January, 2023.

Finch has played county cricket in England, first for Yorkshire County Cricket Club in 2014 and 2015 before joining Surrey from 2016. In July 2018, during the 2018 t20 Blast, he scored 131 not out for Surrey, setting a new record for the highest T20 individual score for Surrey in a county match and hitting the highest T20 score at the Hove County Ground.

Indian Premier League
Finch has played for a variety of teams in the Indian Premier League (IPL). He was first selected by Rajasthan Royals in 2010 before going on to play the next two seasons for Delhi Daredevils. 2013 saw him play for Pune Warriors India, 2014 for Sunrisers Hyderabad and 2015 for Mumbai Indians, although his opportunities for the side were limited due to injury. In 2016 he was bought by Gujarat Lions, playing for the side for two seasons, before being bought by Kings XI Punjab in the 2018 IPL Auction. He was released by KXIP at the end of the season and opted out of 2019 IPL season in order to prepare for the 2019 Cricket World Cup. He was bought by Royal Challengers Bangalore ahead of the 2020 season. In 2022, Finch was signed by the Kolkata Knight Riders as a replacement for Alex Hales for the 2022 Indian Premier League.

International career

Finch made his international debut for Australia in a T20I against England in January 2011. Two years later he made his One Day International (ODI) debut against Sri Lanka. In August 2013, Finch set a new record for the highest individual score in a Twenty20 international, scoring 156 runs from 63 balls against England at the Rose Bowl, Southampton. Finch's innings included 14 sixes (also a record) and 11 fours. He was the first player to score 150 runs in a T20I innings. He was awarded the Men's T20I Player of the Year at the Allan Border Medal ceremony by Cricket Australia in 2014.

Finch was selected as part of Australia's 2015 Cricket World Cup squad. In Australia's first group match against England he top scored with 135 runs, helping Australia to a 111 run win. Despite being the top rated T20I batsman, he was dropped for the first two matches of Australia's campaign in the 2016 ICC World T20 before being reinstated for the last two matches of the campaign.

In January 2017, Finch was named as stand-in captain for the first ODI against New Zealand in Australia's tour of New Zealand after Matthew Wade was withdrew from the side with an injury. Before the second ODI of that series Wade was ruled out of series due to a back injury and Finch continued to captain in the remaining matches.

In April 2018, he was awarded a national contract by Cricket Australia for the 2018–19 season and in July scored 172 against Zimbabwe, a new record T20I individual score. He hit 10 sixes in the innings during a world record T20I opening stand of 223 runs with D'Arcy Short which ended in the final over of the innings. The partnership was the second highest for any wicket in a T20I.

In September 2018, he was named in Australia's Test match squad for their series against Pakistan in the United Arab Emirates, making his Test debut on 7 October. He had his baggy green cap presented to him by Allan Border before going on to score 62 and 49 runs in his two innings in the match.

In April 2019, Finch was named the captain of Australia's squad for the 2019 Cricket World Cup. On 16 July 2020, Finch was named in a 26-man preliminary squad of players to begin training ahead of a possible tour to England following the COVID-19 pandemic. On 14 August 2020, Cricket Australia confirmed that the fixtures would be taking place, with Finch included in the touring party.

In November 2020, Finch was nominated for the ICC Men's T20I Cricketer of the Decade award.

On 5 March 2021, Finch became the leading run-getter for Australia in T20I format going past David Warner against New Zealand. In August 2021, Finch was named as the captain of Australia's squad for the 2021 ICC Men's T20 World Cup. Finch would then captain Australia to win their maiden T20 World Cup, defeating New Zealand in the final by eight wickets. And in his captaincy Australia won their maiden T20 World Cup.

On 10 September 2022, Finch announced his retirement from ODI cricket ahead of the third ODI against New Zealand, but still planned to play in T20Is. He continued to captain Australia's Twenty20 side and led it in it’s failed defence of the T20 World Cup in October and November 2022 in Australia. 
 On 7 February 2023, Finch announced his retirement from international cricket.

International centuries 
During his career Finch has scored 19 centuries in international cricket  17 in One Day Internationals and two in Twenty20 International

Personal life
Finch married Amy Griffith in 2018; the couple have a daughter. He is a supporter of the Australian Football League team Geelong Cats.

References

External links 

 

1986 births
Auckland cricketers
Australia Test cricketers
Australia One Day International cricketers
Australia Twenty20 International cricketers
Australian cricket captains
Australian cricketers
Cricketers at the 2015 Cricket World Cup
Cricketers at the 2019 Cricket World Cup
Cricketers from Victoria (Australia)
Delhi Capitals cricketers
Gujarat Lions cricketers
Living people
Melbourne Renegades cricketers
Pune Warriors India cricketers
Rajasthan Royals cricketers
Ruhuna Royals cricketers
Sunrisers Hyderabad cricketers
Surrey cricketers
Victoria cricketers
Yorkshire cricketers
People from Colac, Victoria
Punjab Kings cricketers
Royal Challengers Bangalore cricketers
Kolkata Knight Riders cricketers